Coleophora corylifoliella is a moth of the family Coleophoridae. It is found in the United States, including Kentucky, Pennsylvania and Virginia.

The larvae feed on the leaves of Corylus americana. They create a spatulate leaf case.

References

corylifoliella
Moths described in 1861
Moths of North America